Ikenna Martin "Ike" Opara (born February 21, 1989) is an American former soccer player who is currently an assistant coach for Sporting Kansas City II in MLS Next Pro.

Career

College and amateur
Opara played college soccer at Wake Forest University from 2007 to 2009 where he appeared in 65 games scoring nine goals and adding three assists. He was a member of Wake Forest's 2007 NCAA College Cup Championship team. He was named ACC Defensive Player of the year in 2008 and 2009.

During his college years Opara also played two seasons for Cary Clarets in the USL Premier Development League.

Professional

San Jose Earthquakes 
Opara was drafted in the first round (3rd overall) of the 2010 MLS SuperDraft by San Jose Earthquakes.

He made his professional debut on March 27, 2010, in San Jose's opening game of the 2010 MLS season against Real Salt Lake,and scored his first professional career goal - an away match winner - against Chicago Fire on April 10, 2010.

His time with the Earthquakes was plagued by repeated foot injuries.

Sporting Kansas City 
Opara was traded to Sporting Kansas City from San Jose on December 12, 2012, for Kansas City's natural second-round selection in the 2013 MLS SuperDraft.

Opara made his league debut for SKC on March 23, 2013, in a 0-0 away draw with the New England Revolution. He scored his first league goal for the club about four months after his debut, in a 2-1 away win over Real Salt Lake on July 20, 2013. His goal, scored in the 96th minute, won the match for Sporting. Although he was on the bench, Opara and SKC won the 2013 MLS Cup over Real Salt Lake on penalties. Opara logged 21 appearances and was named Sporting KC Newcomer of the Year for 2013.

Opara would go on to establish himself as a regular, solidifying one of the top defenses in MLS over the next few seasons, alongside his central back partner Matt Besler, converted right back Graham Zusi and left back Seth Sinovic. This group won the 2015 and 2017 U.S. Open Cups alongside their stellar keeper, Tim Melia. On November 10, 2017, Opara was awarded the MLS Defender of the Year Award and was selected to the MLS Best XI for his spectacular performances during the 2017 MLS season, joining his fellow SKC player, goalie Tim Melia, on the list.

Minnesota United FC 
On January 28, 2019 Sporting KC traded Opara to Minnesota United FC for $900,000 of TAM and an additional $100,000 contingent upon Minnesota qualifying for the playoffs for the first time in its brief franchise history. He scored his first goal for Minnesota against the Seattle Sounders off a set piece in a 1-1 home draw on May 4, 2019.  He was awarded the MLS Defender of the Year Award for 2019  On August 5, 2021, Minnesota opted to buyout Opara's contract.

National Team 
Opara was selected to the United States Men's National Team on January 8, 2018. After attending the January camp for the national team, he played the full 90 minutes in a friendly versus Bosnia and Herzegovina, his only cap to date.

Coaching

Sporting Kansas City II 
After departing Minnesota United, Opara served as a scout for Nashville SC.  Opara returned to Sporting Kansas City in January 2022, being named assistant coach for the club's MLS Next Pro side Sporting Kansas City II.

Career statistics

Club

International

Honors
Sporting Kansas City
MLS Cup: 2013
Eastern Conference Championship (Playoffs): 2013
U.S. Open Cup: 2015, 2017

Individual
MLS Best XI: 2017, 2019
MLS Defender of the Year: 2017, 2019

References

External links
 
 
 

1989 births
Living people
American sportspeople of Nigerian descent
Sportspeople from Durham, North Carolina
Soccer players from North Carolina
African-American soccer players
American soccer players
Association football central defenders
Wake Forest Demon Deacons men's soccer players
All-American men's college soccer players
Cary Clarets players
San Jose Earthquakes draft picks
San Jose Earthquakes players
Sporting Kansas City players
Minnesota United FC players
USL League Two players
Major League Soccer players
United States men's under-20 international soccer players
United States men's under-23 international soccer players
United States men's international soccer players
21st-century African-American sportspeople
20th-century African-American people
Sporting Kansas City II coaches
Nashville SC non-playing staff